Castellazzi is an Italian surname. Notable people with the surname include:

Armando Castellazzi (1904–1968), Italian footballer
Luca Castellazzi (born 1975), Italian footballer
Mario Castellazzi (1935–2018), Italian footballer
Paolo Castellazzi (born 1987), Italian footballer

Italian-language surnames